Ayrılık Çeşmesi is an underground station on the M4 line of the Istanbul Metro. It was opened on 29 October 2013 to provide a connection to the Marmaray station and trains crossing the Bosphorus. It is the most recently opened station on the line as the rest of the line opened on 17 August 2012. Ayrılık Çeşmesi has an island platform serviced by two tracks.

Station Layout

References

Railway stations opened in 2013
Istanbul metro stations
Transport in Kadıköy
2013 establishments in Turkey